North District Football Club, currently known as Golik North District due to sponsorship reasons, is a Hong Kong football club which currently competes in the Hong Kong First Division.

The club plays most of its home matches at Fanling Recreation Ground and North District Sports Ground.

History
North District began fielding a football team in the Hong Kong football league system in 2003 as part of a Hong Kong Football Association initiative to involve district representative teams. North District were part of a group of 11 districts who participated in the inaugural season of this project.

During the 2008–09 season, North District finished second bottom from the table and came close to being eliminated from the football league. However, the club was able to finish second in the Elimination Playoff and was allowed to remain.

As part of the HKFA's decision to unify the Third Division A League and the Third Division District League, North District were placed in the Hong Kong Fourth Division during the 2012–13 season based on their prior season's results.

Starting from the 2016–17 season, North District has been branded as Golik North District due to sponsorship reasons.

On 29 April 2018, North District defeated KCDRSC 4–1 to clinch the Hong Kong Third Division title for the first time. They gained promotion to the Hong Kong Second Division.

In the 2018–19 season, North District won the Hong Kong Second Division title and was promoted to the Hong Kong First Division.

Honours

League
 Hong Kong Second Division
 Champions (1): 2018–19
 Hong Kong Third Division
 Champions (1): 2017–18

References

External links
 North District at HKFA

2003 establishments in Hong Kong
Football clubs in Hong Kong
Hong Kong First Division League
North District, Hong Kong
Association football clubs established in 2003